County Road 161 is a  road in Nordland County, Norway. It is also locally named Sør-Herøyveien (South Herøy Road). It runs from Kjerkåsen in the municipality of Herøy to the island of Tennvalen in the same municipality. The road follows the southeast coast of the island of Sør-Herøy, crosses a bridge over Tennsundet (Tenna Strait), and then continues southwest along the length of the island of Tenna, terminating at the island of Tennvalen.

References

External links
Statens vegvesen – trafikkmeldinger Fv261 (Traffic Information: County Road 161)

161
Herøy, Nordland